Leif Folke Enar Forsberg (born 15 April 1963) is a Swedish former footballer who played as a forward.

Career 
He made his professional debut with GIF Sundsvall at the age of 17, and played his last game for the club at the age of 38. He represented the Sweden Olympic football team seven times between 1987 and 1988, scoring two goals.

Personal life
Forsberg is the son of footballer Lennart Forsberg and has a son, Emil Forsberg, who is also a footballer. He is nicknamed "Lill-Foppa".

References

External links

Living people
1963 births
Association football forwards
Swedish footballers
Allsvenskan players
GIF Sundsvall players
IFK Göteborg players
People from Sundsvall
Sportspeople from Västernorrland County